The Rupture (formerly named The Collagist) is a literary journal founded in 2009 by American author Matt Bell. The first issue appeared in August 2009. It was renamed The Rupture in 2019. It is one of the longest running online literary magazines.  Work appearing in The Rupture has appeared in numerous award anthologies, including the Pushcart Prize, The Best American Poetry, the Wigleaf top 50, the Best of the Net.

See also
List of literary magazines

References

External links
Official Site
The Review Review Reviews The Collagist 2014

2009 establishments in Michigan
Bimonthly magazines published in the United States
Magazines established in 2009
Magazines published in Michigan
Online literary magazines published in the United States